The great diving beetle (Dytiscus marginalis) is an aquatic diving beetle native to Europe and northern Asia, and in the UK is common in  Wales, much of England and southern Scotland but less common on chalk and in the far north.
The great diving beetle, true to its name, is a rather large insect.

These beetles live in fresh water, either still or slow-running, and seem to prefer water with vegetation. They are dark-coloured (brown to black) on their back and wing cases (elytra) and yellow on their abdomen and legs. The male's wing cases are shiny, while those of the female are finely grooved. A voracious predator, this beetle hunts a wide variety of prey including  small fish. The first two pairs of legs of the male are equipped with numerous suction cups, enabling them to obtain a secure grip while mating, and on their prey. One of its many prey include the Pseudacris crucifer, the spring peeper, when it is in its larval stage. After the spring peeper reaches adulthood, it becomes the predator.   

They are able fliers, and fly usually at night. They use the reflection of moonlight to locate new water sources. This location method can sometimes cause them to land on wet roads or other hard wet surfaces.

Before they dive, they collect air bubbles in their wing cases which goes through the spiracles. The jaws of a great diving beetle are strong compared to their body size.

The beetle reproduces by laying eggs under water in the mesophyll of an aquatic plant leaf. The incubation period is between 17 and 19 days.

References

Dytiscidae
Beetles of Europe
Beetles described in 1758
Taxa named by Carl Linnaeus